Miminegash is a rural municipality in Prince Edward Island, Canada. It is part of a small area in Lot 3 known as either the St. Louis, Palmer Road, or Miminegash area. This area is often associated with Tignish due to the shared Acadian roots between these areas.

Demographics 

Community 
Miminegash is within  of the following communities, known collectively as the St. Louis–Miminegash area. The area was a major source and processing center for Irish Moss harvested locally from the sea. Once processed into carrageenan, it is used as an emulsifier or a source of gloss for things such as ice cream, chocolate milk or lipstick.
St. Louis
Palmer Road
Pleasant View
Roseville
St. Lawrence
Waterford
Skinner's Pond
Palmer Road north
DeBlois
St. Edward

References 

Communities in Prince County, Prince Edward Island
Rural municipalities in Prince Edward Island